The Ivy League Baseball Championship Series is the conference baseball championship of the NCAA Division I Ivy League.  The top two finishers from the round-robin regular season participate in a best of three series held at campus sites, with the winner earning the conference's automatic bid to the NCAA Division I Baseball Championship.  In 2022,  defeated  in three games.  The event was canceled for 2020 and 2021 due to the coronavirus pandemic.

History
In 1930, six of the eight Ivy League teams formed the Eastern Intercollegiate Baseball League.  Harvard joined in 1934, while Brown, Army and Navy joined in 1948.  When Army and Navy joined the Patriot League for the 1993 season, the Ivy League began sponsoring baseball.  

The teams are split into two divisions; the Mid-Atlantic members are in the Lou Gehrig Division, and the New England members are in the Red Rolfe Division.  Beginning in 2018, the divisions were dissolved, with the top two teams from the regular season meeting in the championship series. The team with the best regular season record is named the Ivy League champion. However, the winner of the championship series gains the league's automatic bid to the NCAA Division I baseball tournament.

Champions
For a list of EIBL champions, see List of Eastern Intercollegiate Baseball League Champions

By year
The following is a list of conference champions and sites by year.

By school
The following is a list of conference champions listed by school.

References